The 2016 Damallsvenskan is the 28th season of the Swedish women's association football top division, Damallsvenskan. FC Rosengård were the defending champions, having won the competition in 2015.

Linköpings FC is the champion of the season.

Teams 

Note: 1 According to each club information page at the Swedish Football Association website for Damallsvenskan.

League table

Top scorers 
.

References

External links 
 Season at soccerway.com

Damallsvenskan seasons
1
Dam
Sweden